The Coatham Bowl (later known as the Redcar Bowl) was an entertainment venue located in Redcar, England. It hosted events ranging from conferences, dances and pop concerts. The bowl was a particularly popular venue for concerts during the early-1970s to 1990s. Notable past performers include Whitesnake, Yes, Iron Maiden, Uriah Heep. In 2014 the venue was demolished.

See also
Redcar Jazz Club

References 

Music venues in North Yorkshire
Redcar